Yang Dan or Dan Yang is the name of:
 Yang Dan (chemist) (杨丹), Hong Kong-Chinese chemist
 Dan D. Yang (杨丹), businesswoman
 Yang Dan (neuroscientist) (丹扬), Chinese-American neuroscientist